Henry Meade Doremus (May 23, 1851 – January 16, 1921) was the Republican Mayor of Newark, New Jersey, from January 1, 1903, to January 1, 1907.

Biography
Doremus was born on May 23, 1851, in Jacksonville, New Jersey. He was a delegate to the Republican National Convention from New Jersey, 1904, 1916, 1920.

He died on January 16, 1921, and is buried at Fairmount Cemetery, Newark.

References

1851 births
1921 deaths
Burials at Fairmount Cemetery (Newark, New Jersey)
Mayors of Newark, New Jersey